Weßling (Oberbay) station is a railway station in the municipality of Weßling, located in the Starnberg district in Upper Bavaria, Germany.

Notable places nearby
Weßlinger See

References

External links

Munich S-Bahn stations
Railway stations in Bavaria
Buildings and structures in Starnberg (district)
Railway stations in Germany opened in 1903
1903 establishments in Bavaria